John Travis may refer to:

John Travis (physician), leading figure in the wellness movement
John Travis (producer), music producer, audio engineer, mixer and songwriter
John Travis (soccer), former U.S. soccer player
John D. Travis (1940–2016), former member of the Louisiana House of Representatives